The Thrill Can Kill was an anti-drug campaign from the motion picture industry which ran from 1987 to 1990, by the Partnership for a Drug-Free America organization. Featuring celebrities such as Pee-Wee Herman, Clint Eastwood, Nancy Reagan, Bette Midler, James Woods, Olivia Newton-John, Ally Sheedy, Dudley Moore, Roy Scheider, Roseanna Arquette, and Rae Dawn Chong, the anti-drug video spots ran 38 to 90 seconds in movie theaters. The campaign was promoted by First Lady Nancy Reagan, with money and talent provided by the MPAA studios. The first movie to feature a spot from the campaign was the July 1987 theatrical release of Jaws: The Revenge.

References

Public service announcements of the United States
American advertising slogans
Advertising campaigns
American television commercials
1980s television commercials
Drug policy of the United States
Anti-drugs public service announcements
1987 neologisms